Gujarat Tea Processors and Packers Limited (GTPPL) is an Indian multinational FMCG company, headquartered in Ahmedabad. It is best known for its Wagh Bakri brand of tea. The company was founded on September 22, 1980.

GTPPL is the third-largest packaged tea company in India. It markets regular leaf, dust, and flavored tea under its major brand. GTPPL leads the market share in Gujarat at 70%, where its flagship brand 'Wagh Bakri' ranks 7th in the national market. The company also offers other brands including Good Morning, Mili and Navchetan.

GTPPL certified organic green tea bags and cartons are available for purchase across India. The company owns and operates fifteen tea lounges across the country. Additionally, its products are sold in the US, Canada, Middle East, Europe, Australia, New Zealand, Fiji, Malaysia, and Singapore. Exports contributed to about 5% of total sales by the company as of March 2021.

History

1892 to 1915
In 1915, businessperson Noranda's Desai returned to India after gaining experience in the tea business. Desai was responsible for tending to a tea garden in South Africa of felicitates. Upon his return to India, Desai created Gujarat Tea Depot Co., which was established soon after.

1934 to 1980
In 1934, the ‘Wagh Bakri’ brand was born. Before then, 'Wagh Bakri' was referred to as Gujarat Tea Depot Co. The company was renamed to Gujarat Tea Processors & Packers Ltd. Wagh is Gujarati for tiger, and Bakri is goat. Wagh (the tiger represents upper class) and Bakri (the goat represents lower class) drinking tea from the same cup. It symbolizes harmony and shows how tea is a great leveler.

1998 to 2003
Gujarat Tea Processors & Packers Ltd launched ‘Wagh Bakri’ Tea brand in Rajasthan, Madhya Pradesh, and other states in India.

2007 to 2009

It was between 2007 and 2009, when ‘Wagh Bakri’ Tea brand was launched in the states of Maharashtra, Delhi, Uttar Pradesh, and NCR (National Capital Region) India. The company also launched of a Tea Lounge under the brand name ‘Wagh Bakri Tea Lounge’ in Mumbai. Wagh Bakri Tea Lounge serves variety of flavored tea and snacks. Taking the lounge facility further, Wagh Bakri Tea Lounge was launched in Delhi.

2014
The company launched another Tea Lounge at Bharat Diamond Bourse in Mumbai, Maharashtra.

Operations

The company processes and packs tea leaves from a tea factory located in Kheda District, Gujarat, India and has its head office based in Ahmedabad City, Gujarat. Packaged tea is distributed through a supply chain and a distributor network.

Gallery

See also.
History of tea in India

References

External links
 

Companies based in Ahmedabad
Tea companies of India
Tea industry in Gujarat
Indian companies established in 1915
Indian companies established in 1980